A Happy Meal is a kids' meal usually sold at the American fast food restaurant chain McDonald's since June 1979. A small toy or book is included with the food, both of which are usually contained in a red cardboard box with a yellow smiley face and the McDonald's logo. The packaging and toy are frequently part of a marketing tie-in to an existing television series, film or toyline.

Description

The Happy Meal contains a main item (a hamburger, cheeseburger or small serving of Chicken McNuggets), a side item (French fries, apple slices, a Go-Gurt tube or a salad in some areas) and a drink (milk, juice or a soft drink). The choice of items changes from country to country and may depend on the size of the restaurant.

In some countries, the choices have been expanded to include items such as a grilled cheese sandwich (known as a "Fry Kid"), or more healthy options such as apple slices, a mini snack wrap, salads or pasta, as one or more of the options.

History
In the mid-1970s, Yolanda Fernández de Cofiño began working with her husband operating McDonald's restaurants in Guatemala. She created what she called the "Menú Ronald" (Ronald menu), which offered a hamburger, small fries and a small sundae to help mothers feed their children more effectively while at McDonald's restaurants. The concept was eventually brought to the attention of McDonald's management in Chicago. The company gave the development of the product to Bob Bernstein, who then came up with the idea for the Happy Meal.

In 1977, the McDonald's restaurant owner clients who regularly met with Bernstein were looking for ways to create a better dining experience for families with kids. Bernstein reasoned that if kids could get a packaged meal all their own instead of just picking at their parent's food, everybody would be happier. He had often noticed his young son at the breakfast table poring over the various items on cereal boxes and thought, "Why not do that for McDonald's? The package is the key!" He then called in his creative team and had them mock up some paperboard boxes fashioned to resemble lunch pails with the McDonald's Golden Arches for handles. They called in nationally known children's illustrators and offered them the blank slate of filling the box's sides and tops with their own colorful ideas from art to jokes to games to comic strips to stories to fantasy: whatever they thought might appeal to kids, at least eight items per box. Inside the box would be a burger, small fries, packet of cookies and a surprise gift. A small drink would accompany these items. Bernstein then named it the Happy Meal and it was successfully introduced with television and radio spots and in-store posters in the Kansas City market in October 1977. Other markets followed and the national roll-out happened in 1979.

Bernstein received  #1136758 (Serial #73148046) for his idea in 1977 which he assigned to his valued client, McDonald's Corporation, on June 10, 1980. In 1987 at the annual McDonald's marketing meeting, he was recognized for his accomplishment with a full-size golden replica of the Happy Meal box with the following inscription:

McDonald's Happy Meal 10th Anniversary 1977-1987
To Robert A. Bernstein, Bernstein-Rein Advertising
Thank you for bringing the Happy Meal, a bold idea, to the McDonald's System.
Your insight and conviction truly has made McDonald's a fun place for children for the past 10 years!
McDonald's Corporation
September, 1987

Often, the Happy Meal is themed to promote a children and family-oriented film or television series. The first such promotion was the "Star Trek Meal", which promoted Star Trek: The Motion Picture in December 1979. The packaging used for the Star Trek Meal consisted of various images and games related to the film, as well as a comic strip adaptation of the film. Consumers had to buy numerous meals in order to complete the set. In 1982, McDonald's recalled Playmobil Happy Meal toys because they could have been dangerous to children under three years of age. In 1992, McDonald's withdrew their range of Happy Meal toys for the film Batman Returns, after complaints from parents that the film was unsuitable for children.

In July 2011, McDonald's announced plans to make Happy Meals healthier, including the addition of apples. The redesigned meals will contain a smaller portion (1.1 ounces) of fries, along with the apples. On February 4, 2013, McDonald's announced that Fish McBites (fried Alaskan pollock, the same fish used in Filet-O-Fish) would be added as an entree, which would run until March, intended to coincide with Lent.

In 2014, McDonald's introduced a mascot to Happy Meals in the United States named Happy, who originated in France and some international countries as early as 2009. Reactions were mixed, including criticism that the mascot's design was too frightening.

Happy Meal toy

The Happy Meal did not introduce the practice of providing small toys to children. When the Happy Meal was launched in 1979, the toys were a McDoodle stencil, a McWrist wallet, an ID bracelet, a puzzle lock, a spinning top or a McDonaldland character-shaped eraser. In Canada, the promotion prior to the Happy Meal was called the "Treat of the Week", where a different toy was available free on request each week. This promotion continued after the Happy Meal was introduced in 1979 while Happy Meal toys have also become increasingly elaborate in recent years. While they were initially cheap items such as a Frisbee or ball, they have gradually been replaced with increasingly sophisticated toys, many of which are a tie-in to an existing TV series, film, video game or toy line.

The Happy Meal toys are designed for ages 2+, while the toddler toys are aimed at 3 and younger.

Bans
On November 2, 2010, the San Francisco Board of Supervisors passed a law requiring that children's meals sold in restaurants must meet certain nutritional standards before they could be sold with toys. The law, urged in part by an increase of childhood obesity in the United States, would allow toys to be included with children's meals that have fewer than 600 calories and fewer than 640 milligrams of sodium, contain fruits and vegetables, and include beverages without excessive fat or sugar. The board overturned the veto of Mayor Gavin Newsom on November 23, 2010, to pass the law. The law has been ridiculed by the satirical news program The Daily Show. McDonald's circumvented the ban by charging 10 cents for the toys.

A class action lawsuit seeking to ban Happy Meal toys in California was filed in 2010. The suit was dismissed in April 2012.

In Chile, the Happy Meal, along with kids' meals at other fast food chains, no longer includes free toys, in response to a 2012 law banning such toys in a move to prevent obesity.

Adult version 
An adult version of the Happy Meal was released in 2022 as a limited release collaboration with Cactus Plant Flea Market. The meal, which includes a standard Big Mac or Chicken McNuggets combo meal, comes with a collectible toy of Cactus Buddy or four-eyed caricatures of McDonaldland characters Grimace, Birdie or the Hamburglar.

See also
 Burger King Kids Club

References

External links
 

McDonald's foods
McDonald's advertising
Products introduced in 1979
Toy brands
Food for children
American inventions